Margaret Senior OAM (1917 – 25 January 1995) was an English/Australian Natural History, Wildlife and Children's Book Illustrator. She contributed to a significant portion of early Illustration of Australia's exploration of rich natural Fauna and Flora. Her works are held in the collections of New South Wales Department of Primary Industries Orange Scientific Collections Unit and The University of Newcastle Special Collections Archives. She created numerous Illustrated posters and Botanical Plates for the NSW National Parks and Wildlife Service. Her illustrations were heavily used by parks and Wildlife, including Bushfire prevention posters.

Growing up in London Senior moved to Australia in the 1940's. She left a bequest of $50,000 gift left to the University of Newcastle. Known for its Bachelor of Illustration (Natural History) established in 2003.  This was up until the Bachelor of Natural History Illustration its disestablishment in 2019. Senior also left the copyright of her published work to the University, including a large number of her original artworks. She contributed $10,000 during her lifetime to the Margaret Senior Wildlife Illustration Award for one excellent graduating student each year.

Senior was awarded the Medal of the Order of Australia in the 1988 Queen's Birthday Honours List for services to wildlife conservation.

Illustrated books 
Senior illustrated numerous books during her career. Most notably 'The Australia Book' which won the 1952 Children's Book of the Year Award: Older Readers.

References 

Natural history illustrators
1917 births
1995 deaths
Recipients of the Medal of the Order of Australia
Australian women illustrators
English emigrants to Australia
Artists from London
English children's book illustrators
Australian children's book illustrators
British women illustrators
20th-century Australian women artists
20th-century English women artists